Reviews in Clinical Gerontology is a quarterly peer-reviewed medical journal covering gerontology. It was established in 1991 and is published by Cambridge University Press. The editor-in-chief is Antony Bayer (Cardiff University).

External links 
 

Gerontology journals
Cambridge University Press academic journals
Quarterly journals
Publications established in 1991
English-language journals